AS 2805 Electronic funds transfer - Requirements for interfaces is the Australian standard for financial messaging. It is near-exclusively used in Australia for the operation of card-based financial transactions among banks, automatic teller machines and EFTPOS devices.

It is closely related to ISO 8583, but pre-dates it by two years (1985 vs 1987).

External links
 AS 2805 at SAI Global (the distributor for Standards Australia).

Standards of Australia
Payment interchange standards
Banking in Australia